An anatomy murder (sometimes called burking in British English) is a murder committed in order to use all or part of the cadaver for medical research or teaching. It is not a medicine murder because the body parts are not believed to have any medicinal use in themselves. The motive for the murder is created by the demand for cadavers for  dissection, and the opportunity to learn anatomy and physiology as a result of the dissection. Rumors concerning  the prevalence of anatomy murders are associated with the rise in demand for cadavers in research and teaching produced by the Scientific Revolution. During the 19th century, the sensational serial murders associated with Burke and Hare and the London Burkers led to legislation which provided scientists and medical schools with legal ways of obtaining cadavers. Rumors persist that anatomy murders are carried out wherever there is a high demand for cadavers. These rumors, like those concerning organ theft, are hard to substantiate, and may reflect continued, deep-held fears of the use of cadavers as commodities.

History
Dissection as a way of acquiring medical knowledge has existed since the ancient world, but during the Renaissance, increasingly widespread clandestine practices of post-mortem dissection led to fears that victims, especially the poor and outcast, would be murdered for their cadavers. During his years at the University of Padua, Andreas Vesalius made it clear that he had taken human remains from graveyards and ossuaries for his classic anatomical text De humani corporis fabrica. Both he and his successor, Gabriele Falloppio, were rumored to have practiced human vivisection, although these rumors were not substantiated; however, Falloppio himself reported that he was asked by the judicial authorities to carry out an execution on a condemned criminal, whose cadaver he then dissected. During the 18th century, prominent British obstetrician William Smellie was accused of murder to obtain cadavers for his illustrated textbook on childbirth. In 1751, Helen Torrence and Jean Waldie were convicted of murdering John Dallas, aged 8 or 9, and selling his cadaver to medical students in Edinburgh.

The great expansion in medical education in Great Britain in the early 19th century, as a result of the Napoleonic Wars, led to increased demand for cadavers for dissection. Body-snatching became more widespread, and local communities reacted by setting guards around graveyards.  In 1828, Parliament convened a select committee to examine the means by which cadavers were obtained for medical schools. This was the same period when the most famous of the anatomy murders were carried out by William Burke and William Hare. They killed 16 people over the course of a year, selling the cadavers to the anatomist Robert Knox. Two years later, the London Burkers, John Bishop and Thomas Williams, murdered a boy identified as Carlo Ferrari, and attempted to sell his cadaver to a London surgeon.

The most recent account of anatomy murders was in 1992, when a Colombian activist, Juan Pablo Ordoñez, claimed that 14 poor residents of Barranquilla, Colombia, had been killed to provide cadavers for the local medical school. One of the alleged victims managed to escape from his assailants and his account was publicized by the international press.

Legislation
The difficulty of prosecuting cases of anatomy murders arises because of the difficulty of obtaining evidence. The victims are generally marginal and do not have anyone to report their disappearance.  The cadavers, which may show evidence of homicide,  are destroyed by dissection. Those dissecting the bodies may believe that they have been obtained legitimately, or may have a vested interest in keeping their practices quiet.

For these reasons, legislation from the 19th century on has focused on removing the motive for murder by providing legal sources of cadavers for medical research and teaching. In Great Britain, the Anatomy Act of 1832 provided for cheap, legal cadavers by turning over the bodies of those who died in caretaker institutions to medical schools. Although there were public protests at using the bodies of the poor as raw material for medical students, proponents of the Act were able to use fear of burking in order to get it passed. The Massachusetts Anatomy Act of 1831 was also inspired by the anatomy murders.

It is clear that the legislation reduced the demand for illegally obtained cadavers and may have acted as a deterrent against grave-robbing, as the latter practice persisted in localities without adequate provision for cadavers to dissect. It is likely, however, that the main deterrent against anatomy murders was the increasing sophistication of forensic science from the 19th century onward.

See also

 Murder for body parts

References

Further reading
"Reminiscences Of A Medical Student Prior To The Passing Of The Anatomy Act" (1879) The British Medical Journal, Vol. 1, No. 941, pp. 59–60
Knott, John (1985). "Popular Attitudes to Death and Dissection in Early Nineteenth Century Britain", Labour History, No. 49, pp. 1–18
Helen Macdonald (2010). Possessing the Dead. Melbourne University Press.
Sappol, Michael (2002. A Traffic of Dead Bodies: Anatomy and Embodied Social Identity in 19th-Century America. Princeton University Press.
Wilf, Stephen Robert (1989). "Anatomy and Punishment in Late Eighteenth-Century New York", Journal of Social History, Vol. 22, No. 3 pp. 507–530

External links
Dream Anatomy Exhibit
Historical Anatomies on the Web
  Proceedings of the Old Bailey 1674-1913
The Worlds of Burke and Hare
London Science Museum's History of Medicine website
Echoes of the Scottish Resurrection Men

Crimes
History of anatomy
Murder